Abdelkader "Kader" Zitouni (born 7 June 1981) is a football referee of Tunisian descent who comes from Limoges, France. He operated in the 2011 Pacific Games, 2012 OFC Nations Cup and 2016 OFC Nations Cup.

Zitouni has served as a FIFA referee from 2012, and was included as a support referee in the 2017 FIFA Confederations Cup and the 2019 FIFA Club World Cup.

References

External links 
 
 

1981 births
Living people
French Polynesian football referees
French Polynesian people of Tunisian descent